John Gardiner Austin, CMG (7 August 1812 – 25 July 1900) was a British colonial administrator. He was Lieutenant-Governor of British Honduras 1864–1867, and Colonial Secretary of Hong Kong from 1868 to 1879, acting as Administrator (acting Governor) of the colony in 1877.

Background and early life

Career

Austin was appointed Lieutenant-Governor of British Honduras in February 1864, and served for two years until 1867.

In 1868, he was appointed Colonial Secretary of Hong Kong, serving as such until 1879. He was also Auditor General of the colony from 1870 to 1879, and Administrator (acting Governor) from March to April 1877. He was appointed a Companion of the Order of St Michael and St George (CMG) in March 1876, for his services in Hong Kong.

Family
Austin married, in 1836, Emma Wilday (1 February 1811 – 9 May 1879), and was the father of six sons and four daughters, including:
 Charles Wilday Austin (19 January 1837 – 1 December 1862)
 John Gardiner Austin (19 July 1838 – 8 March 1902), who in September 1901 was appointed a Member of the Barbados Legislative council. Sir Harold Austin was his son.
 Mehetabel Percy Austin (29 February 1840 – 27 December 1943), who married in 1862 Axel Dickson (1826–1899), a member of the Swedish parliament of Scottish origin. She was one of few people born on leap day to celebrate a centennial.

Legacy
Mount Austin on Hong Kong Island, Austin Road and Austin Avenue in Kowloon were named after him. The Austin station of the MTR was so-named due to its proximity to Austin Road West, and the naming may be more influenced by geographical convenience rather than any direct link to Austin himself.

References

Austin, John Cardiner
1812 births
1900 deaths
Governors of British Honduras